House Joint Resolutuion 4223 was a constitutional amendment in Washington which passed the house and was approved by the voters of the state in the 2006 general election.

This amendment would authorize the legislature to increase the personal property tax exemption for taxable personal property owned by each "head of a family" from three thousand ($3,000) to fifteen thousand ($15,000) dollars.

References
Original text of Amendment

2006 Washington (state) ballot measures